Agonum belleri, sometimes called Beller's ground beetle, is a species of ground beetle in the Platyninae subfamily.

Description
The species are metallic-black in colour.

Distribution
The species can be found only in Pacific Northwest of North America. A. belleri lives in sphagnum bogs.

Taxonomy
The species was named after Samuel Beller, an entomologist who was one of the Melville H. Hatch's pupils.

References

belleri
Beetles of North America
Beetles described in 1933